The 1993–1994 international cricket season was from September 1993 to April 1994.

Season overview

October

1993–94 Pepsi Champions Trophy

November

1993 Hero Cup

New Zealand in Australia

December

West Indies in Sri Lanka

Zimbabwe in Pakistan

1993-94 Benson & Hedges World Series

South Africa in Australia

January

Sri Lanka in India

February

Pakistan in New Zealand

England in the West Indies

Australia in South Africa

March

India in New Zealand

April

1993-94 Pepsi Austral-Asia Cup

References

1993 in cricket
1994 in cricket